The XIV World Rhythmic Gymnastics Championships were held in Sarajevo, SR Bosnia and Herzegovina, Yugoslavia, on 27 September – 1 October 1989.

Individual

All-Around

Rope

Hoop

Ball

Ribbon

Team

Group

All-Around

Final 6 clubs

Final 3 hoops + 3 ribbons

References

1989
International gymnastics competitions hosted by Yugoslavia
1989 in Yugoslav sport
September 1989 sports events in Europe
October 1989 sports events in Europe
1989 World Rhythmic Gymnastics Championships
Sports competitions in Sarajevo
1989 in Bosnia and Herzegovina